King of the Delta Blues Singers, Vol. II is a compilation album by American blues musician Robert Johnson, released in 1970 by Columbia Records. In 2003, the album was ranked number 424 on Rolling Stone magazine's list of the 500 greatest albums of all time.

Music
The album compiles sixteen recordings, ten of which were previously available as 78 rpm records on the Vocalion label, originally recorded during five sessions in 1936 and 1937. Through the course of the 1960s, blues music had become more visible in the popular music landscape of the day. Songs from Johnson's first album had been covered by popular rock artists in the late sixties, including Eric Clapton and the Rolling Stones.

Columbia decided it was time to issue another Johnson album, scoured the vaults again and came up with nine additional Vocalion masters, three unreleased alternate takes and two unreleased tracks (a matrix was made for "Drunken Hearted Man" in 1937 but it seems it was never released). Likely finding no further acceptable recordings, to bring the number of tracks to the same sixteen as on Volume I, "Ramblin' On My Mind" and "Preachin' Blues" from the earlier LP were issued again.

Although not quite as popular or influential as its predecessor, it includes recordings of two Johnson songs that have become blues standards, "Sweet Home Chicago" and "I Believe I'll Dust My Broom." In contrast to the deeply emotive songs released on the 1961 album, many of the tracks on Volume II display Johnson's lighter side.

King of the Delta Blues Singers, Vol. II was reissued on August 10, 2004 by the Legacy Records subsidiary of Sony Music Entertainment, with the master version of "Ramblin' On My Mind" appended as a bonus track.

Track listing

Side one

Side two

2004 reissue bonus track

Notes

References

External links
 King of the Delta Blues Singers, Vol. II at Discogs

Robert Johnson albums
1970 compilation albums
Columbia Records compilation albums